Choi Young-rae (Hangul: 최영래; ; born May 13, 1983 in Danyang, Chungcheongbuk-do) is a South Korean sport shooter who competes in the men's 10 metre air pistol and the 50 metre pistol. At the 2012 Summer Olympics, he finished 35th in the qualifying round for the 10 metre air pistol, failing to make the cut for the final. However, in the men's 50 metre pistol, he won a silver medal, completing a Korean one-two.

References

South Korean male sport shooters
Living people
Olympic shooters of South Korea
Shooters at the 2012 Summer Olympics
Olympic silver medalists for South Korea
Olympic medalists in shooting
1983 births
Medalists at the 2012 Summer Olympics
Sportspeople from North Chungcheong Province
Asian Games medalists in shooting
Shooters at the 2014 Asian Games
Asian Games silver medalists for South Korea
Medalists at the 2014 Asian Games
20th-century South Korean people
21st-century South Korean people